István Csirmaz (born 4 May 1995) is a Hungarian football player who plays for Diósgyőr.

Club career
On 30 August 2021, Csirmaz signed with Puskás Akadémia. 

On 16 June 2022, Csirmaz moved to Diósgyőr.

Club statistics

Updated to games played as of 9 December 2017.

References

External links
Profile at MLSZ 

1995 births
People from Mezőkövesd
Sportspeople from Borsod-Abaúj-Zemplén County
21st-century Hungarian people
Living people
Hungarian footballers
Association football midfielders
Mezőkövesdi SE footballers
Szolnoki MÁV FC footballers
Ceglédi VSE footballers
Csákvári TK players
Puskás Akadémia FC players
Diósgyőri VTK players
Nemzeti Bajnokság I players
Nemzeti Bajnokság II players